Mozart & Friends is a record production and songwriting team working in the genres of pop, R&B and hip hop. The team was founded in 2006 and consists of producers and songwriters located in different countries:

 German mix-engineer, songwriter and producer Marc Mozart ("Mixed by Marc Mozart").
 US-based Doctor Fink, keyboard player of Prince's first band
 US-based J. Worthy, official remixer for No Angels single "Teardrops"
 Austria-based Patrick Flo Macheck, official remixer of the German No. 1 single "Hot Summer"
 Melbourne, Australia-based producer and songwriter Alf Tuohey, official remixer for No Angels single "Disappear"
 German-based producer-songwriter Manuel Loyo, official remixer for No Angels single "Disappear"
 German-based producer-songwriter Alexander Gernert, official remixer for No Angels single "Disappear"
 Hamburg, Germany-based producer-songwriter Alexander Hahn, official remixer for No Angels single "Disappear"
 German-based lyricist-songwriter Alexander "Indy" Krause

Partial discography

Selected songs and productions
2011
 "One Thousand Voices" by The Voice of Holland - songwriting (Alfred Tuohey), publishing (Mozart & Friends)
2009
 "Disappear" by No Angels - remix production for official remixes:
Yin Yang RMX, Chartlab House RMX, Soundbomb House RMX

2007
 "Take A Minute" by Room 2012 - production, songwriting
 "Family Song" by Jimi Blue - production, songwriting
 "Who's That Girl" by Jimi Blue - production, songwriting
 "All Alone" by Jimi Blue - production, songwriting
 "Party In The City" by Jimi Blue - production, songwriting
 "Never Give Up" by Popstars On Stage Allstars - production, songwriting
 "Allstars" by Popstars On Stage - album production
 "Teardrops" by No Angels - remix production
 "Real Man" by Lexington Bridge feat. Snoop Dogg - remix production
 "I'm Lovin... (l.r.h.p.)" by Jimi Blue - remix production
 "Hot Summer" by Monrose - official remix
 "Diamonds and Pearls" by Monrose - production, mixing
 "Push Up On Me" by Monrose - production, mixing
 "Two Of A Kind" by Monrose - co-production

Music production companies